Bikram Keshari Deo (26 November 1952 – 7 October 2009) was a member of the 12th, 13th and 14th Lok Sabha of India. 
 He represented the Kalahandi constituency of Orissa and was a member of the Bharatiya Janata Party (BJP).

He died on 7 October 2009 after suffering a cardiac arrest.

References

External links
 Members of Fourteenth Lok Sabha - Parliament of India website

Bharatiya Janata Party politicians from Odisha
India MPs 1998–1999
India MPs 1999–2004
India MPs 2004–2009
1952 births
2009 deaths
Lok Sabha members from Odisha
People from Kalahandi district